Elizbar Odikadze (born 14 June 1989) is a Georgian freestyle wrestler. He competed in the men's freestyle 97 kg event at the 2016 Summer Olympics, in which he lost the bronze medal match to Albert Saritov.

He represented Georgia at the 2020 Summer Olympics in the men's freestyle 97 kg event.

References

External links
 

1989 births
Living people
Sportspeople from Tbilisi 
Male sport wrestlers from Georgia (country)
Olympic wrestlers of Georgia (country)
Wrestlers at the 2016 Summer Olympics
Wrestlers at the 2015 European Games
Wrestlers at the 2019 European Games
European Games medalists in wrestling
European Games silver medalists for Georgia (country)
European Games bronze medalists for Georgia (country)
World Wrestling Championships medalists
European Wrestling Championships medalists
Wrestlers at the 2020 Summer Olympics
21st-century people from Georgia (country)